Angelique and the King (French: Angélique et le Roy), Italian: Angelica alla corte del re) is a 1966 historical adventure film directed by Bernard Borderie. It stars Michèle Mercier. It was made as a co-production between France, Italy and West Germany.

It was shot at the Billancourt Studios in Paris. Location shooting took place at Versailles, the Abbey of Fontenay, the Château de Chantilly and Senlis. The film's sets were designed by the art director Robert Giordani.

Plot
In the third film of the Angelique series, the title character is sent on a mission by King Louis XIV of France. Later she learns that rumors are spreading that she is the King's mistress. In addition, she learns a secret that a satanic cult are practicing human sacrifices.

Cast
Michèle Mercier as Angélique de Plessis-Bellière
Robert Hossein as Jeoffrey de Peyrac
Jean Rochefort as Desgrez
Claude Giraud as Philippe de Plessis-Bellières
Jacques Toja as Louis XIV
Sami Frey as Bachtiary Bey
Estella Blain as De Montespan
Fred Williams as Ràkóczi
Pasquale Martino as Savary
Jean Parédès as Saint-Amon
René Lefèvre as Colbert 
Michel Galabru as Bontemps
Philippe Lemaire as de Vardes
Ann Smyrner as Thérèse
Carol Le Besqueas as La Desoeillet
Michel Thomass as Monsieur de Bonchef
Robert Favart as the surgeon
Roberto as Barcarolle

Box office
The film sold 9,477,873 tickets in France, Germany and Spain. It also sold  tickets in the Soviet Union, for a worldwide total of 52,777,873 ticket sales.

References

External links 
 

1966 films
1960s historical romance films
French historical romance films
1960s French-language films
Films directed by Bernard Borderie
Films produced by Raymond Borderie
Films set in the 1670s
Films based on French novels
Films based on historical novels
Films based on romance novels
French sequel films
Gloria Film films
German historical romance films
Italian historical romance films
West German films
German sequel films
Films shot at Billancourt Studios
Italian sequel films
1960s French films
1960s Italian films
1960s German films